Kurt Wilhelm Rothschild (October 21, 1914-November 15, 2010) was a well known Austrian born economist.  He lectured at the University of Glasgow (1938–1947), worked as a researcher at the Austrian Economic Research Institute (1947–1966) and was one founding fathers of the University of Linz, working there from 1966 until 1985. His work in economics was wide ranging running from contributions to microeconomic and macroeconomic theory and history of economic thought to questions of both economic methodology and economic policy. Throughout his career, he advocated pluralism in economics and took a critical approach to what came to be termed neoliberalism and he has been described as a Heterodox or as a Keynesian economist.

Selected publications

References

External links 
 Digitized literary estate of Kurt W. Rothschild - correspondences, works and personal documents
 Kurt W. Rothschild  from the online archive of the Österreichischen Mediathek
 Life and work of Kurt W. Rothschild

1914 births
2010 deaths
Austrian economists

University of Vienna alumni
Academic staff of Johannes Kepler University Linz
Austrian expatriates in the United Kingdom